Al Iskandariyah may refer to:

 Iskandariya, Iraq
 Alexandria, Egypt
 Al Iskandariyah Governorate, Egypt